The Puhi Puhi River is a river of the Marlborough Region of New Zealand's South Island. One of the tributaries is the Clinton River.

See also
List of rivers of New Zealand

References

Rivers of New Zealand
Rivers of Canterbury, New Zealand